Exile Paradise is In Strict Confidence's sixth studio album. The album peaked at #3 on the German Alternative Charts (DAC) and ranked #31 on the DAC To pAlbums for 2006.

The album is sold as both two CDs and a DVD; and as a single CD (disc one).

The opening and closing tracks on disc one, "The Harder They Come…" and "…The Harder They Fall" are short instrumental tracks of a similar style.

Track listing

Disc three also contained:
 Remix kits "Promised Land" & "Forbidden Fruit"
 Desktop wallpapers
 Link section

References

2006 albums
In Strict Confidence albums